An Essay on Matisse is a 1996 American short documentary film directed by Perry Wolff. It was nominated for an Academy Award for Best Documentary Short.

References

External links

1996 independent films
1996 films
1990s short documentary films
American short documentary films
American independent films
Documentary films about painters
Henri Matisse
1990s English-language films
1990s American films